Joanne McCartney is a British barrister and Labour Party and Co-operative Party politician. Since 2004, she has served as a member of the London Assembly, representing Enfield & Haringey. Following the election of Sadiq Khan as Mayor of London in 2016, McCartney has served as Statutory Deputy Mayor of London.

Prior to her career in politics, McCartney worked as a barrister specialising in employment law. She also worked as an adjudicator for the Housing Ombudsman dealing with disputes between landlords and tenants.

McCartney was elected a councillor in the London Borough of Enfield in 1998, representing Edmonton and then Palmers Green. McCartney was elected to the London Assembly for Enfield and Haringey in the 2004 Assembly Elections and stood down as a councillor at the 2006 local elections.

She was on the London Advisory Board for the Commission for Racial Equality. As Deputy Mayor, McCartney worked to create "Early Years Hubs" for disadvantaged children. As an Assembly Member, she has campaigned on rail devolution and child poverty.

McCartney won re-election in 2008 by approximately 1,400 votes. In the 2012 election, she increased her margins to 36,741 votes. In the 2016 election, she broke records by winning by a margin of 51,152 votes.

McCartney has three children, and was chair of governors at her local primary school.

References

External links
Official site
London Assembly profile

Living people
Labour Co-operative Members of the London Assembly
Councillors in the London Borough of Enfield
Commissioners for Racial Equality
English barristers
Year of birth missing (living people)
Women councillors in England